Moses Elects Seventy Elders is a painting by Jacob de Wit, completed in December 1737 and commissioned for the interior of the City Hall in Amsterdam. It shows Moses electing seventy elders (Numbers 11:16-17, 24–25) and is now in the Royal Palace of Amsterdam. It is one of thirteen paintings by the artist on Hebrew Bible themes.

Sources
https://www.rijksmuseum.nl/en/collection/SK-A-1783

1737 paintings
Paintings depicting Moses
Collection of the Royal Palace of Amsterdam